Edward Lavern "Eddie" Johnstone (born March 2, 1954) is a Canadian former professional ice hockey player. He played for the Michigan Stags/Baltimore Blades in the World Hockey Association (WHA), followed by parts of ten seasons in the National Hockey League (NHL) with the New York Rangers and Detroit Red Wings. He featured in the 1979 Stanley Cup Finals with the Rangers.

Johnstone was born in Brandon, Manitoba, but grew up in Vernon, British Columbia.

Playing career
Johnstone played major junior with the Medicine Hat Tigers of the Western Canada Hockey League from 1971 to 1974. After two consecutive 100 point seasons with Medicine Hat, Johnstone was drafted 104th overall by the New York Rangers in the 1974 NHL amateur draft, and 78th overall by the Michigan Stags in the 1974 WHA Amateur Draft. He played 23 games for the Stags in 1974–75 and played in the American Hockey League (AHL) for the Providence Reds. Johnstone started his National Hockey League career in 1975–76, scoring 3 points in 10 games. Johnstone played for the Rangers until the end of the 1982–83 season, before being traded to the Detroit Red Wings along with Ron Duguay and Eddie Mio for Mike Blaisdell, Willie Huber, and Mark Osborne. He played for the Red Wings and their AHL affiliate, the Adirondack Red Wings before retiring in 1987.

Awards and achievements
Named to the AHL First All-Star Team in 1977.
Played in NHL All-Star Game (1981)
 In the 2009 book 100 Ranger Greats, was ranked No. 65 all-time of the 901 New York Rangers who had played during the team's first 82 seasons

Career statistics

Regular season and playoffs

References

External links
 

1954 births
Living people
Adirondack Red Wings players
Baltimore Blades players
Canadian ice hockey coaches
Canadian ice hockey right wingers
Detroit Red Wings players
ECHL coaches
Greensboro Generals (SHL) players
Ice hockey people from British Columbia
Ice hockey people from Manitoba
Johnstown Chiefs coaches
Medicine Hat Tigers players
Michigan Stags draft picks
Michigan Stags players
New Haven Nighthawks players
New York Rangers draft picks
New York Rangers players
Sportspeople from Vernon, British Columbia
Providence Reds players
Sportspeople from Brandon, Manitoba
Vernon Vipers players